Pra Frente, Brasil is a 1982 Brazilian drama film directed, written and produced by Roberto Farias. It tells the fictional story of a man mistakenly arrested by a group linked to the military dictatorship during the 1970 FIFA World Cup.

Plot
The film is set on mid 1970, when the military regime's "economic miracle" and the victory of the Brazil national football team on the FIFA World Cup serves as a distraction for the persecution of opposition leaders by the political police of the dictatorship.

Under this context, Jofre Godoi da Fonseca, an alienated middle class man, is mistaken for Sarmento, a political activist he met at an airport prior to his assassination. He is then arrested and brutally tortured by a paramilitary group of vigilantes sponsored by influential businessmen to hunt down people deemed "subversive" by the regime.

Jofre's wife Marta and his brother Miguel join forces to investigate his disappearance. After they fail to get enough support from law enforcement agents, Mariana, leader of a left-wing resistance group and Miguel's former girlfriend, helps them. Their efforts proved to be useless after Jofre is killed on a failed escape attempt.

Cast
 Reginaldo Faria as Jofre Godoi
 Antônio Fagundes as Miguel Godoi
 Natália do Vale as Marta Godoi
 Elizabeth Savalla as Mariana
 Carlos Zara as Dr. Barreto
 Cláudio Marzo as Sarmento

Awards and nominations
33rd Berlin International Film Festival
 Golden Bear – Roberto Farias (nominated)
 C.I.C.A.E. Award – Roberto Farias (won)
 OCIC Award – Roberto Farias (won)

10th Gramado Film Festival
 Best Film – Roberto Farias (won)
 Best Editing – Roberto Farias, Maurício Farias (won)

17th Silver Daisy Awards
 Best Feature Film – Roberto Farias (won)

9th Festival de Cine Iberoamericano de Huelva
 Critic's Choice Award

References

External links
 
 

1982 drama films
1982 films
Brazilian drama films
Films about Brazilian military dictatorship
Films directed by Roberto Farias
1980s Portuguese-language films
Film controversies in Brazil